Arthemis are an Italian power metal/heavy metal band.

History
Originally called "Nemhesis" having recorded a six-track demo in 1996 under that name, they were formed by the guitarist Andrea Martongelli in 1999. Singer Alessio Garavello joined Arthemis in 1999 (shortly after the release of Church of the Ghost and also became the second guitarist after Matteo Ballottari had left the band.

Arthemis have released eight studio albums starting with the 1999 debut album Church of the Ghost. The band has also appeared on rock and metal themed TV shows Rock TV Sala Prove, Rock TV Database, and played for an advertising spot for “Fiat” cars. In 2010, Arthemis appeared on the Metal Hammer UK Judas Priest tribute album The Metal Forge: Volume 1 - Judas Priest: British Steel, covering "United".

Under the leadership of original member, Andrea Martongelli, the band has moved from power metal to a more heavy metal and thrash metal sound.

Current band lineup
 Fabio Dessi - vocals (2009- )
 Andrea Martongelli - guitars/backing vocals (1994- )
 Giorgio Terenziani - bass guitar (2013- )
 Francesco Tresca  - drums (2012- )

Former members
 Alessio Garavello - vocals/guitars (1999–2009)
 Matteo Ballottari - guitars (1998-2007)
 Paolo Perazzani - drums/backing vocals (1994-1996; 2002-2009)
 Matteo Galbier - bass guitar/backing vocals (1994-2009)
 Alberto Caria - lead vocals (1997-1999)
 Corrado Rontani - drums (2009-2011)
 Paolo Caridi - drums (2011-2012)
 Damiano Perazzini - bass guitar (2009-2013)

Discography
 Church of the Ghost (1999)
 The Damn Ship (2002)
 Golden Dawn (2003)
 Back From the Heat (2005)
 Black Society (25 June 2008)
 Heroes (7 June 2010)
 We Fight (13 June 2012)
 Blood-Fury-Domination (2017)

References

External links
Official Arthemis website
Official Arthemis My Space Profile

Italian power metal musical groups
Musical quartets
Musical groups established in 1994
1994 establishments in Italy
Scarlet Records artists